Victory is the fifth full-length studio release from noted R&B/soul/pop singer/songwriter/drummer/producer Narada Michael Walden.  Released in 1980 on Atlantic, it featured him once again teaming up with producer Bob Clearmountain.

Track listing
All songs written by Narada Michael Walden, except where noted.

"The Real Thang" (Walden, Bunny Hull, Corrado Rustici) 5:37
"I Want You" (Walden, Rustici, Lisa Walden) 4:33
"Take it to the Bossman" (Walden, Randy Jackson, Vicki Randle) 4:21
"Alone Without You" (Walden, Hull) 4:28
"Get Up!" 4:25
"Lucky Fella" (Walden, Rustici) 4:22
"You Will Find Your Way" 4:10
"Victory Suite" 8:35
"The Theme"
"The Battle/Hero-Soldiers Battle the Hostile Forces"
"Victory for the Hero-Soldiers"

Personnel
Narada Michael Walden - vocals, drums, percussion, piano
Randy Jackson - bass
Corrado Rustici - acoustic and electric guitars
Frank Martin - keyboards, synthesizers, piano, vocal backing
The "See America Horns":
Marc Russo, Wayne Wallace - alto and tenor saxophone
Bill Lamb, David Grover - trumpet, flugelhorn

Production
Arranged by Narada Michael Walden
Produced by Narada Michael Walden and Bob Clearmountain
Recorded and mixed by Bob Clermountain; assistant recording engineers: Wayne Lewis, Willard Laurie
Mastered by Dennis King

External links
Victory at Discogs

1980 albums
Atlantic Records albums
Albums produced by Narada Michael Walden
Albums produced by Bob Clearmountain
Narada Michael Walden albums